Juan José Carricondo Pérez (born 4 May 1977), commonly known as Juanjo, is a Spanish professional footballer who plays for UA Horta as an attacking midfielder.

Never having played in higher than Segunda División in his own country – with the exception of one game for Barcelona – he would spend seven years of his career playing in England (two seasons) and Scotland (five), representing a total of four clubs.

Club career

Barcelona
Born in Barcelona, Catalonia, Juanjo was a youth product at La Liga giants FC Barcelona. During the three years he spent with the team as a senior, however, he only appeared once for the main squad, against Deportivo de La Coruña at the Riazor Stadium (ten minutes played in an eventual 2–2 draw).

Scotland / England
In 1998, Juanjo moved to Edinburgh to play for Heart of Midlothian, where he received his first taste of Scottish football. His spell at the club was very successful, as he amassed official totals of 85 games and 11 goals during his three-year stint.

Juanjo later followed manager Jim Jefferies to England and Bradford City in the second division. He scored on his debut appearance for his new team, against Walsall. After one and a half seasons, he returned to his country and signed with Real Jaén in Segunda División B.

John Robertson, manager of Inverness Caledonian Thistle, offered Juanjo a return to Scotland in the summer of 2004. He was one of the most influential players in the Caley Jags' first-ever season in the Scottish Premier League, scoring and assisting alike as they finished eighth.

A ruptured achilles tendon injury kept Juanjo from participating in Inverness's games in the early part of the following campaign. When he returned to fitness, he found himself falling out of favour with player-coach Craig Brewster and, during the following January transfer window, the player was allowed to move to Hamilton Academical on loan for the rest of the season. He scored two goals for the team, in the Scottish Cup against Dundee F.C. and in the league against Brechin City.

Later years
Aged 29, Juanjo left Inverness and Scotland, joining another side in his country's third level, Granada CF. In the following two years he played amateur football with as many teams, in his native region.

In July 2008, Juanjo was an unnamed trialist for Airdrie United in a pre-season testimonial against Blackburn United, in honour of captain Craig Spence's ten years at the junior side. In January of the following year, he briefly returned to England, being handed a trial with League Two side AFC Bournemouth following recommendation from former club midfielder Claus Bech Jørgensen, his former teammate at Bradford; however, nothing came of it.

In late August 2009, Juanjo signed with Gibraltar United FC, leaving after one season at the age of 33 and resuming his career in Cyprus and in the Spanish lower leagues.

References

External links

London Hearts profile

1977 births
Living people
Footballers from Barcelona
Spanish footballers
Association football midfielders
La Liga players
Segunda División players
Segunda División B players
Tercera División players
Divisiones Regionales de Fútbol players
CF Damm players
FC Barcelona C players
FC Barcelona Atlètic players
FC Barcelona players
Real Jaén footballers
Granada CF footballers
CE Premià players
CE Mataró players
CF Gavà players
UA Horta players
Scottish Premier League players
Heart of Midlothian F.C. players
Inverness Caledonian Thistle F.C. players
Hamilton Academical F.C. players
English Football League players
Bradford City A.F.C. players
Cypriot Second Division players
ASIL Lysi players
APEP FC players
Aris Limassol FC players
Spanish expatriate footballers
Expatriate footballers in Scotland
Expatriate footballers in England
Expatriate footballers in Cyprus
Spanish expatriate sportspeople in Scotland
Spanish expatriate sportspeople in England
Spanish expatriate sportspeople in Cyprus